The Invacar (abbreviated from "invalid carriage") was a small single-seater microcar vehicle designed for use by disabled drivers, and distributed for free in the UK.

History 

In 1948, Bert Greeves adapted a motorbike for exclusively manual control with the help of his paralysed cousin, Derry Preston-Cobb, as transport for Preston-Cobb. In the number of former servicemen disabled in the Second World War they spotted a commercial opportunity and approached the UK government for support, leading to the creation of Invacar Ltd. The British Ministry of Pensions distributed Invacars free to disabled people from 1948 until the 1970s.

During the 1960s and 70s the Invacar, with its modern fibreglass shell and ice-blue colouring—nicknamed Ministry Blue after the Ministry of Health—was produced in the tens of thousands. Developments—including an extended wheelbase, widened track and use of Austin Mini wheels—saw the Invacars right through to the end of the final DHSS contract in 1977. More than 50 variants were produced.

On 31 March 2003, all Invacars owned by the government were recalled and scrapped because of safety concerns. The veteran vehicle could not meet modern-day government regulations, which required approval under the Motorcycle Single Vehicle Approval scheme as part of a standard set by the European Union.  There were still around 200 Invacars in Britain before the 2003 recall and scrapping programme. Hundreds of stockpiled Invacars in government warehouses were scrapped, along with all their spare parts. A few examples survive in the hands of private owners and museums in Britain and abroad. Invacars can still be used on UK roads; only vehicles owned by the government were scrapped. As of 2022, there were 59 examples still registered in the UK

All Invacars were owned by the government and leased to disabled drivers as part of their disability benefit.  Their use had been in decline since the introduction of the Motability scheme, which offers disabled drivers a conventional car with modified options. In 2018, it featured in BBC 4 programme The NHS: A People's History with Alex Brooker.

See also 
 Greeves Motorcycles
 Invalid carriage
SMZ cyclecar (a similar vehicles in the USSR)
 List of car manufacturers of the United Kingdom

Notes

References

External links 
 The Thundersley/AC INVACAR
 Invacar Ltd from The Invalid Carriage Register
 More about Invacars and other cars with a backward slanted rear window
 'My car was so small my date sat on the floor' - BBC News

Defunct motor vehicle manufacturers of England
Microcars
Companies based in Essex
Cars introduced in 1948